"Melody" is a song by British record producer and DJ Sigala from his upcoming second studio album Every Cloud. The single was released on 21 January 2022. by Ministry of Sound and B1 Recordings. The song features uncredited vocals by Norwegian songwriter and singer Ida Botten.

The song reached the top ten on the Dutch charts and the top 40 in the UK and Ireland.

Background
The piece was written in Sigala's studio in London with a group of close friends he has known for a long time. Sigala stated that they decided to create an "unforgettable melody" and eventually used this concept as the basis of the song. The producer also called the song "a new chapter" in his career

Music video
The music video was published on 4 February 2022 on YouTube and was filmed in the city of Teotihuacán de Arista, Mexico.

Charts

Weekly charts

Year-end charts

Certifications

Release history

References

2022 singles
2022 songs
Sigala songs
Songs written by Sigala
Number-one singles in Poland